Umberto Risi (born 31 December 1940) is a retired Italian steeplechase runner. He competed at the 1968 Summer Olympics but failed to reach the final. Risi won a bronze medal at the 1971 Mediterranean Games. His personal best for the steeplechase was 8:33.8 minutes, set in 1970.

Biography
Risi ran for Italy at the 1970 International Cross Country Championships but failed to finish. He was later selected for the 1973 IAAF World Cross Country Championships, but again did not finish. He was twice a competitor at the European Athletics Championships (1969 and 1971), but did not progress beyond the steeplechase heats of either competition.

He was a two-time Italian national champion in the steeplechase, winning in 1969 and 1970.

References

External links
 

1940 births
Living people
Athletes from Rome
Italian male steeplechase runners
Italian male long-distance runners
Olympic athletes of Italy
Athletes (track and field) at the 1968 Summer Olympics
Mediterranean Games bronze medalists for Italy
Athletes (track and field) at the 1971 Mediterranean Games
Mediterranean Games medalists in athletics